The American Association for the Abolition of Involuntary Mental Hospitalization (AAAIMH) was an organization founded in 1970 by Thomas Szasz, George Alexander, and Erving Goffman for the purpose of abolishing involuntary psychiatric intervention, particularly involuntary commitment. The founding of the AAAIMH was announced by Szasz in 1971 on the American Journal of Public Health and American Journal of Psychiatry. In the Platform Statement of the association, one can read:

Board chairman of the association was Thomas Szasz. The association provided legal help to psychiatric patients and published a journal, The Abolitionist. The organisation was dissolved in 1980.

See also 

 Thomas Szasz
 Wrongful involuntary commitment

References 

Organizations established in 1970
1970 establishments in New York (state)
Organizations disestablished in 1980
1980 disestablishments in New York (state)
Organizations based in Syracuse, New York
Mental health organizations in New York (state)
Human rights organizations based in the United States
Anti-psychiatry
Defunct organizations based in New York (state)